The Los Angeles Angels are an American professional baseball team based in Anaheim, California, established in 1961.

Los Angeles Angels may also refer to:

 Los Angeles Angels (California League) (1892–1902)
 Los Angeles Angels (PCL) (1903–1957) Pacific Coast League (PCL), sold to the Los Angeles Dodgers

See also
 Angel (disambiguation)